This article lists important figures and events in the public affairs of British Malaya during the year 1943, together with births and deaths of prominent Malayans. Japanese forces continued to occupy Malaya.

Events 
Below, the events of World War II have the "WW2" acronym.
 July – WW2: Japanese Prime Minister Hideki Tojo announced that Kedah, Perlis, Kelantan and Terengganu were to be returned to Thailand and become Syburi, Palit, Kalantan, Trangkanu provinces.
 18 October – WW2: Thailand began administering the states as Syburi (ไทรบุรี), Palit (ปะลิส), Kalantan (กลันตัน) and Trangkanu (ตรังกานู) provinces.
 13 November – WW2: Action of 13 November 1943

Births
 9 February – Muhammad Uthman El-Muhammady – Muslim cleric
 17 May – Syed Sirajuddin Syed Putra Jamalulail – 12th Yang di-Pertuan Agong
 10 July – Sanusi Junid – Politician
 29 July – Hj Jamaluddin bin Shahadan – Former Silat teacher
 16 October – Omar b. Mohamed Dan – Former Director of Malaysian Prison Department
 22 October – Chua Jui Meng – Politician and former Ministry of Health (1995-2004)
 17 November – Roseyatimah – Actress (died 1987)
 Unknown date – Mat Jahya Hussin – Muslim cleric
 Unknown date – Rahmah Rahmat – Actor (died 1993)
 Unknown date – S. Rosley – Actor (died 2017)

Deaths 
 13 May – Sultan Abdul Hamid Halim Shah, 26th Sultan of Kedah (1881-1943)
 5 December – Abdul Rahim Kajai – Father of Journalist Malaya

References

See also
 1943 
 1942 in Malaya | 1944 in Malaya
 History of Malaysia

1940s in Malaya
Malaya